Dipak Sarma is a flutist from the Assam state of India. Recently, he has been  critically unwell and is currently undergoing treatment in Guwahati

Works

Music director
Jonky Panoi
Jatinga Ityadi
Working on Luitak Vetibo Kune

Discography
Story of Love released by Raaga and Rocks International Company Ltd.
Beyond the Horizon

In TV serials
Sharma composed music for Karm and Wazir broadcast on Zee TV and also featured in an instrumental jugalbandi of classical and western music.
He played flute for the background music of Kaleidoscope on Star Plus.

Awards
Best Musician of the year 2006 (N.E.T.V. Private Channel)
Sangeet Prabha Awards. (2007)
Assam Sports Cultural Jury Award. (2007)
Jams of Assam. (2008)
Azim Hazarika Award. (Sivasagar Press Club)

References

Year of birth missing (living people)
Living people
Indian flautists
People from Kamrup district
Musicians from Assam